Gus Kuester (January 25, 1888 – December 21, 1980) was an American politician who served in the Iowa House of Representatives from the 30th district from 1935 to 1957.

He died on December 21, 1980, in Griswold, Iowa at age 92.

References

1888 births
1980 deaths
Speakers of the Iowa House of Representatives
Republican Party members of the Iowa House of Representatives